"Battle Born" is the first single from The Wrong Side of Heaven and the Righteous Side of Hell, Volume 2, the fifth studio album from Five Finger Death Punch, and is the sixteenth single overall from the band.  The song went to radio on September 9, 2013 with the official music video published on October 2, 2013.

Premise 

According to lead vocalist Ivan Moody, after 24 months of travelling what seemed to be every part of the world and shaking hands with a large number of people, that even though he was doing what he always dreamed of, that he was psychologically and physically depleted.  Because he lost track of time, the flights, the hours on the tour bus and the concerts all seemed to blur together with his relatives and companions becoming a distant relic of the past.  Moody concludes by stating that:

"Everything worth fighting for you will actually HAVE TO fight for. Every wish, every dream, every idea comes to existence only through blood, sweat, and sacrifice... we are all Battle Born".

Production 
The composition was one of the first few songs that the band wrote when putting together The Wrong Side of Heaven and the Righteous Side of Hell, Volume 1 and Volume 2.  Because the ensemble tours ten months per year, the tune was a way for lead vocalist Ivan Moody to release all of the tension built up during that time. Moody goes on to say that after shaking hands and giving one's soul, that it is still not enough, as someone always wants more. The name of the song defines the band as a unit, and comes from the state emblem of Nevada from where the band comes.

Reviews 
Giving the song 5 stars out of 5, Artistdirect describes the composition as "their best slow song since "The Bleeding"".

Personnel 
 Zoltan Bathory – rhythm guitar
 Jason Hook – lead guitar, backing vocals
 Ivan Moody – lead vocals
 Chris Kael – bass, backing vocals
 Jeremy Spencer – drums

Charts

Weekly charts

Year-end charts

References 

Five Finger Death Punch songs
2013 singles
2013 songs
Eleven Seven Label Group singles
Songs written by Kevin Churko
Songs written by Zoltan Bathory
Songs written by Ivan Moody (vocalist)
Songs written by Jason Hook
Songs written by Jeremy Spencer (drummer)
American hard rock songs